Katakanahalli or Katnalli is a village in the southern state of Karnataka, India. It is located in Bijapur taluk of the Bijapur district, Karnataka, and nearly 15 kilometers (km) from the district headquarters, Bijapur. It's one of the small villages near Bijapur.

Demographics 

As of 2010, Katakanahalli has a population of 2000 with 1200 males and 800 females.

Temples 

Shree Hanuman Temple, Shree Mahalaxshmi Temple and Shree Sadashiv Mutt.

Agriculture 

More than 80% of the village's land is fertile and used for crops. The village mainly grows sugar cane, grape, maize, sorghum, and a small amount of lemon, onion and turmeric. Irrigation is mainly based upon water canals, borewells and wells.

Transportation 

Katakanahalli is connected to the nearby cities of Bijapur and Ukkali.

Education 

In the village there is a Govt Higher Primary School (HPS, Katakanahalli), which currently accommodates over 150 students from the 1st to the 7th standard grade. The whole village has a literacy rate of more than 70%.

Trusts 

Some local associations organize cultural and sports programmes, as well as other activities.

Festivals 

The villagers mainly celebrate Shri Sadashiv Jatra Mohostava and Kara Hunnume, Nagara Panchami, Deepavli, Ugadi, Dassara every year.

References 

Villages in Bijapur district, Karnataka